The Batman Chronicles is a series of comics published by DC Comics from 1995 to 2001, which lasted 23 quarterly issues.

Publication history
With a larger page count than typical comics of the time, most issues contained three separate stories, with Batman usually featuring in at least one of them, and others featuring Batman's friends and foes. The additional four issues of a quarterly title allowed DC to, along with the four existent monthly titles, publish a Batman comic every week of the year.

Collected editions
 Batman: Anarky (The Batman Chronicles #1)
 Batman: Contagion (The Batman Chronicles #4)
 Batman: Arkham - Two-Face (The Batman Chronicles #8) 
 Batgirl: The Greatest Stories Ever Told (The Batman Chronicles #9)
 Batman: Year 100 (The Batman Chronicles #11)
 Batman: Cataclysm (The Batman Chronicles #12)
 Batman: Road to No Man's Land Vol. 1 (The Batman Chronicles #14) 
 Batman: Road to No Man's Land Vol. 2 (The Batman Chronicles #15-16)
 Batman: No Man's Land Vol. 1 (The Batman Chronicles #16)
 Batman: No Man's Land Vol. 2 (The Batman Chronicles #17)
 Batman: No Man's Land Vol. 4 (The Batman Chronicles #18)

References

External links
Batman Chronicles title index

Batman titles

de:Batman (Comicserien)#Batman Chronicles